Dovha Hreblya, formerly Lenine, is a village in Pereiaslav-Khmelnytskyi Raion, Kyiv Oblast (province) of Ukraine. Population is 20 (2014).

External links
 Weather ib Dovga Greblia

Villages in Fastiv Raion